Harland Dixon (November 4, 1885 – June 30, 1969) was a Canadian clog dancer known for his inventive and eccentric moves, being especially good at mimicry and use of a cane.  He was especially successful in partnership with Jimmy Doyle with whom he appeared in a series of Broadway musicals, starting with Let George Do It in 1912. His signature move, which was imitated by others, was to keep his arms stiff by his side while twisting his shoulders.

Biography
He was born on November 4, 1885 in Toronto, Ontario, Canada. He married Charlotte MacMullen.

He migrated to the United States and had a job as a paper hanger in Buffalo, New York then as a freight elevator operator in Boston, Massachusetts. In 1906 he moved to New York City with just  in his pocket and worked for George Primrose in his minstrel show. He then partnered with Jack Corcoran and joined Lew Dockstader's minstrels. It was in 1912 that he dissolved his partnership with Corcoran and joined with Jimmy Doyle.

He died on June 27, 1969 at Physicians Hospital in Queens, New York City.

References

Tap dancers
Canadian male dancers
1885 births
1969 deaths
Eccentric dancers